The MCW Southern Tag Team Championship was the tag team title in Memphis Championship Wrestling from 2000 until the promotion closed in 2002.

Title history

See also
Memphis Championship Wrestling

References

Memphis Championship Wrestling championships
Tag team wrestling championships
Regional professional wrestling championships